Evald is a masculine given name found primarily in Northern Europe, especially in Denmark, Estonia, Norway and Sweden. It is a cognate of the German given name Ewald and may refer to the following individuals:
Eevald Äärma (1911–2005), Estonian pole vaulter and 1936 Olympic competitor 
Evald Aav (1900–1939), Estonian composer
Evald Aavik (born 1941), Estonian actor
Evald Flisar (born 1945), Slovenian writer, poet, playwright, editor and translator
Evald Hermaküla (1941–2000), Estonian actor and director
Evald Ilyenkov (1924–1979), Russian Marxist author and Soviet philosopher 
Evald Konno (1897–1942), Estonian politician and lawyer
Evald Mahl (1915–2001), Estonian basketball player
Evald Mikson (1911–1993), Estonian-born Icelandic football goalkeeper 
Evald Nielsen (1879-1958), Danish silversmith
Evald Okas (1915– 2011), Estonian painter
Evald Rygh (1842–1913), Norwegian banker and politician, former Minister of Finance and Customs
Evald Schorm (1931–1988), Czech film and stage director, screenwriter and actor 
Evald Sikk (1910–1945), Estonian wrestler
Evald Seepere (1911–1990), Estonian boxer and 1936 Summer Olympic competitor
Evald O. Solbakken (1898–1967), Norwegian newspaper editor and politician
Evald Tang Kristensen (1843–1929), Danish folklore collector and author
Evald Thomsen (1913-1993), Danish fiddler and collector and promoter of Danish traditional music
Evald Tipner (1906–1947), Estonian football, ice hockey and bandy player
 

Danish masculine given names
Estonian masculine given names
Norwegian masculine given names
Scandinavian masculine given names
Swedish masculine given names